Shiqian County is a county under the administration of the prefecture-level city of Tongren, in the northeast of Guizhou Province, China.

Area: .

Population: 370,000 in 2002.

Postal Code: 555100.

The government is located in Tangshan town.

Ethnic groups
The Shiqian County Gazetteer (1992) lists the following ethnic groups and their respective locations.

Dong (pop. 61,259)
Miao (pop. 14,257)
Tujia (pop. 4,500)
Longtang, Bailong, Huaqiao, Jufeng
Yao (pop. 1,693)
Beita township: Leijiatun, Wuchaguan
Huaqiao township: Shuiwei village
Mongol (pop. 2,535)
Sunjiaping township, Longchuan district: Yujiazhai, Zhong Yujiazhai, Xia Yujiazhai, Dayanshan
Longdong township: Dingjiaba
Pingdichang township: Leishoushan
Zhongkui township: Hexi Jiangpo, Daping
Zhuang (pop. 585)
Zhongba, Zhongkui, Tangshan
Buyi (pop. 447)
Longtang, Wan'an, Tangshan, Juntian
Qiang (pop. 623)
Wan'an, Jufeng, Tangshan, Shanzhuang
Hui (pop. 323)
Wan'an, Zhongkui, Pingshan, Longtang, Tangshan
Manchu (pop. 131)
Muzhuang, Tangshan
Yi (pop. 368)
Datun, Longdong, Fuyan, Baisha, Tangshan

Climate

Education
It first opened in 1964 and had its current facility open in 2017.

References

External links
Official website of Shiqian County Government

 
County-level divisions of Guizhou